Öråns SK is a sports club in Lycksele, Sweden. Established in 1970, The club won the Swedish national women's table tennis team championship during the season of 1998-1999.

References

1970 establishments in Sweden
Athletics clubs in Sweden
Badminton clubs in Sweden
Ski clubs in Sweden
Sport in Västerbotten County
Sports clubs established in 1970
Table tennis clubs in Sweden